Bennett Park may refer to:
Bennett Park (Detroit), baseball park for the Detroit Tigers that formerly existed in Detroit, Michigan
Bennett Park (New York City), city park in New York City